Avtar Singh Billing (born December 13, 1952) is a Punjabi writer, novelist and story writer. He has written 8 novels, 6 short-story collections and three books on children's literature.

His novel Khali Khoohaan di Katha (The Tale of Empty Wells) won The Dhahan Prize in 2014.

Writings

Novels
Naranjan Mashalchi
Khere Sukh Vehre Sukh
Khali Khoohaan di Katha(The Tale of Empty Wells) 
Rizak (livelihood)

Awards 

 Shiromani Sahitkar - Government of Punjab
 The Dhahan Prize for novel "Khali Khoohaan di Katha" (2014)

References

Writers from Punjab, India
1952 births
Living people